Billy Summers is a crime novel written by American author Stephen King, published by Scribner on August 3, 2021.

Plot 
Billy Summers is a 44-year-old hitman and former U.S. Marine sniper, who only accepts jobs killing truly evil men, but now he wants to retire from the assassin life altogether. Nick Majarian, a mobster whom Billy has worked for many times before, offers him one last job--one that pays $500,000 up front, and $1.5 million after it's done.

Billy's target is Joel Allen, also a hitman, who was arrested for murdering a man who won a fortune off of him in a poker game. Allen has claimed to have valuable information that the police wants in order to make a plea deal, and apparently, someone, whom Nick can't name, doesn't want Allen talking, which is why Billy has been hired to take him out. The job requires Billy to spend some quiet time undercover as a resident in the small town of Midwood, where an office space has been rented out for his use. Billy's cover story is that he is a writer named David Lockridge, who has been tasked by his publishing agent to stay there, and go to the office and write each day in an attempt to meet his deadline. The office has a direct view of the courthouse, where Joel Allen will eventually be taken to be arraigned for his murder charge. Billy is meant to shoot and kill him at that time, and then disappear.

However, Billy starts to become suspicious when Nick offers up a getaway plan for after the hit takes place, since typically he leaves that up to Billy to figure out. Nick's plan involves Billy escaping in a city transit truck that will have someone waiting for him to drive away, causing Billy to suspect that Nick intends to kill him after he pulls off the hit. Instead, Billy starts to formulate his own plan, including renting out a new apartment under the alias, Dalton Smith.

While he waits for the big day to kill Joel Allen, Billy also starts writing his fake book his character is supposed to be writing, just as a way to kill time because, as an avid reader, he wants to. He changes all of the real names, but writes about his life, starting with his little sister being beaten and killed by his mother's drunk boyfriend when he was eleven. A young Billy ended up finding a gun and killing the boyfriend. He later ended up in foster care, and then joined the U.S. Marines when he was 17.

Back in the present, the shooting and killing of Joel Allen goes off without a hitch. Billy evades the transit truck, and gets away by disguising himself as one of the office workers in the building. He then goes to hide out in his Dalton Smith apartment, where he intends to lay low for a while during the police hunt and media frenzy surrounding the shooting. When Nick doesn't pay him the rest of the money he promised after the hit, Billy now knows that his suspicions were correct, and also soon learns that there is a $6 million bounty on his head.

While Billy is trying to remain out of sight from the police, he sees a young woman get dumped out of a truck onto the street, drugged and half-dead. Not wanting to attract police attention to his area, he reluctantly goes out to save her. It turns out that the woman, 21-year-old Alice Maxwell, had just been raped and abandoned by a group of men. Alice recognizes Billy as the shooter, but she ends up wanting to stay with him for a while, fearing that the men who raped her might come back for her.

As Billy continues writing his book, he writes about his experiences in the military, and becoming a talented and decorated sniper. He also writes about an incident in Iraq, where he and his comrades were sent to check out a large house, and a majority of them were killed in action there. One of the survivors, Johnny Capps, would later hook Billy up with his first job as a hitman.

When Billy decides it's time to hit the road and escape from town, he first goes to confront Alice's attackers. He demands that two of them apologize to her over the phone, and then he sodomizes their leader with an immersion blender. After that, Billy and Alice drive across America to Sidewinder, Colorado, to meet with Bucky Hanson, Billy's "broker" and the only person Billy fully trusts, and plans how to go after Nick.

At Nick's Las Vegas estate, Billy pretends to be a migrant gardener, and kills or injures many of Nick's men, including seriously injuring Nick's right-hand man, Frank Macintosh, whose mother Marge also works for Nick. Billy manages to extract a promise from Nick to pay him the money owed, and to tell people that Billy is dead. Nick also confesses to Billy that the person who ordered the hit of Joel Allen was Roger Klerke, a wealthy media mogul. Roger originally hired Allen to kill his own son, Patrick Klerke, after Patrick learned about Roger's secret life as a pedophile, and his promiscuity with young girls, of which he managed to obtain photo evidence. Then, when Patrick learned that his father wasn't planning to pass his company on to him, he lashed out by blackmailing Roger. Allen successfully killed Patrick, but in doing so, discovered the blackmail evidence about Roger as well. So, when Allen got arrested for his murder charge of the man in the poker game and was trying to use that information to cut a plea deal with the prosecutors of his case, Roger turned to Nick to hire someone (Billy) to take out Allen, and then to have Billy dead to prevent a repeat of the Allen situation.

Billy and Alice stay for a long time at Bucky's place, where their relationship grows, and Billy finishes writing his book to bring it all the way up to the present. Meanwhile, he learns that Frank Macintosh lives, but suffers from extreme seizures caused by the pain Billy inflicted upon him. When it's finally time to deal with Roger, Alice takes photos of herself dressed up as a teenager to send to Roger to entice him into a meeting. Roger takes the bait, and Alice and Billy show up at his estate, and Alice shoots and kills Roger. During their escape, Marge Macintosh appears and shoots Billy, hoping to take revenge on what he did to her son. Billy is wounded, and when he and Alice get back to their hotel, Billy thinks about how he's bad for Alice, and she's better off being free from an outlaw lifestyle. He leaves with the hopes of becoming a full-time writer, and maybe even being able to atone for the things he's done in his life.

Then, in the final chapter, it is revealed that the last part of Billy's story was in fact written by Alice as Billy died from his wounds, and Alice wrote it to convey his thoughts, and how she wished he would have survived.

Characters 
 Billy Summers – Also known by his fake identities as David Lockridge or Dalton Smith, the main protagonist, hitman, and former U.S. Marine Corps sniper. 
 Joel Allen – Former hitman, the secondary antagonist, the target of Billy Summers.
 Roger Klerke – Wealthy media mogul, first of the two main antagonists, previously employed Allen and hired Summers for the hit.
 Patrick Klerke – Son of Roger, was killed by Allen as ordered by his father. 
 Nick Majarian – Middleman for Roger and Billy. The second of the two main antagonists.
 Alice Maxwell – Discovered and befriended by Billy. 
 Bucky Hanson– Long-time friend of Billy.
 Frank – An employee of Nick, handicapped by Billy. 
 Marge – Mother of Frank, also employed by Nick.

Background 
Stephen King first mentioned the novel in an NPR interview in April 2020, where he discussed having to change the story from taking place in 2020 to 2019 due to the COVID-19 pandemic. Later that month, in a live streamed conversation with John Grisham, King again mentioned it, saying it was a crime novel about a hired assassin.

Entertainment Weekly officially announced Billy Summers on January 28, 2021, with a release date of August 3, 2021. The announcement also included a short excerpt.

Film adaptation
In February 2022, Deadline Hollywood reported that the novel will be adapted into a ten-episode limited television series with J. J. Abrams, King, Edward Zwick and Marshall Herskovitz as executive producers.  In February 2023, Warner Bros. acquired the project and was developing it into a feature film, with Zwick and Herskovitz writing the script. The film will be produced by Abrams' Bad Robot and Leonardo DiCaprio's Appian Way banner.

Reception 
The novel debuted at number one on The New York Times fiction best-seller list for the week ending August 7, 2021.

In a rave review, John Dugdale of The Sunday Times wrote, "Disciplined but adventurous, equally good at action scenes and in-depth psychology, King shows with this novel that, at 73, he's a writer back at the top of his game." Neil McRobert of The Guardian called it King's "best book in years," praising his "own brand of muscular, heightened realism." McRobert wrote that the "odd balance with the sunlit, languorous first half" of the book succeeded "largely because King is so good at character and making us care through incidental details."

References

External links 
 Billy Summers at StephenKing.com
 Billy Summers at Simon & Schuster

2021 American novels
Novels by Stephen King
American crime novels
Charles Scribner's Sons books
Works about contract killers